Tanjung Duren Selatan is an administrative village in the Grogol Petamburan district of Indonesia. It has postal code of 11470.

See also 
 Grogol Petamburan
 List of administrative villages of Jakarta

References 
The information in this article is based on that in its Indonesian equivalent.

West Jakarta
Administrative villages in Jakarta